On 10 July 1977, two Soviet hijackers took over an Aeroflot Tupolev Tu-134 flight in the hope of diverting it to Stockholm, Sweden. Lacking the fuel to do this, the aircraft landed at Helsinki Airport, Finland, where the hijackers kept hostages to demand that the Finnish authorities refuel the aircraft and provide it with a new crew. However, the hostages escaped after the hijackers fell asleep. Without bargaining power, the hijackers surrendered and were extradited back to the Soviet Union, where they were sentenced to lengthy prison terms.

Incident 
The Tu-134 departed Petrozavodsk Airport on 10 July 1977 with a passenger complement of approximately seventy and an intended destination of Leningrad-Pulkovo Airport. Partway through the flight, however, the aircraft was commandeered by 19-year-old Alexandr Zagirnjak and 22-year-old Gennadi Sheludko. The two had smuggled guns and what appeared to be a grenade on board, though it was later revealed to be a non-explosive training grenade, and demanded that the crew fly the plane to Stockholm.

As the aircraft did not have the fuel to travel over the Baltic Sea to the Swedish capital, the crew were forced to divert to Helsinki Airport, Finland. Upon landing, the hijackers released all of the crew and a significant number of its passengers. The remainder, which reportedly included at least seven children, were held back as hostages. Zagirnjak and Sheludko hoped to use them as leverage to get Finnish authorities to refuel the aircraft, replace the Soviet crew, and allow them to fly to their original destination. This plan was foiled, however, when Zagirnjak and Sheludko fell asleep, which allowed the remaining hostages to escape. Lacking bargaining power, the hijackers surrendered not long after. The Finnish government returned them to the Soviet Union three days later, complying with a unique anti-hijacking treaty they had signed with the Soviets in 1974. Sheludko, who had a previous criminal record for theft, would eventually be sentenced to fifteen years; Zagirnjak received eight.

The incident came as part of a recent increase in airliner hijacking. The Washington Post reported that it was the third such crime in a week, with the others occurring in the Middle East and South America, and that the last successful hijacking of a Soviet aircraft had been only two months earlier.

Footnotes

References

Further reading

External links 
Aircraft photos

1977 in Finland
1977 in the Soviet Union
Aeroflot
Aircraft hijackings
Aviation accidents and incidents in Finland
Aviation accidents and incidents in the Soviet Union
Aviation accidents and incidents in 1977
Terrorist incidents in Finland
Accidents and incidents involving the Tupolev Tu-134
July 1977 events in Europe
Finland–Soviet Union relations
1977 crimes in Finland
Terrorist incidents in the Soviet Union
Terrorist incidents in the Soviet Union in the 1970s
Terrorist incidents in Europe in 1977
Terrorist incidents in Asia in 1977
1977 crimes in the Soviet Union